Gelali (also Romanized as Gelālī) is a village in Baladarband Rural District, in the Central District of Kermanshah County, Kermanshah Province, Iran. At the 2006 census, its population was 187, in 41 families.

References 

Populated places in Kermanshah County